Boško Boškovič (born 12 January 1969 in Koper) is a Slovenian former professional footballer who played as a goalkeeper.

Boškovič was capped 27 times for the Slovenia national team between 1993 and 1998.

See also
Slovenian international players

References

External links
 Profile at Prvaliga 
 Profile at TFF.org
 

1969 births
Living people
Sportspeople from Koper
Slovenian footballers
Association football goalkeepers
Slovenia international footballers
Süper Lig players
2. Bundesliga players
NK Primorac 1929 players
HNK Hajduk Split players
FC Koper players
NK Mura players
Antalyaspor footballers
F.C. Felgueiras players
SC Freiburg players
ND Gorica players
Slovenian expatriate footballers
Slovenian expatriate sportspeople in Turkey
Expatriate footballers in Turkey
Slovenian expatriate sportspeople in Germany
Expatriate footballers in Germany
Slovenian expatriate sportspeople in Portugal
Expatriate footballers in Portugal